The following is the qualification system and qualified athletes for the judo at the 2023 Pan American Games competitions.

Qualification system
A total of 154 judokas will qualify to compete at the games. One quota per each weight category were directly allocated to the gold medal winners in the Cali 2021 Junior Pan American Games. The top nine athletes (one per NOC) in each weight category's ranking after the four best results among eleven qualification tournaments will qualify along with one spot per category for the host nation, Chile. Each nation can enter a maximum of 14 athletes (seven men and seven women), except for NOCs whose athletes qualified by quota for Cali 2021 and may have a maximum of two athletes in one weight category.

For the team event, a county must qualify at least one athlete in each of the following categories:

Women 57kg (48 kg, 52 kg, 57 kg)
Men 73kg (60 kg, 66 kg, 73 kg)
Women 70kg (57 kg, 63 kg, 70 kg)
Men 90kg (73 kg, 81 kg, 90 kg)
Women +70kg (70 kg, 78 kg, +78 kg)
Men +90kg (90 kg, 100 kg, +100 kg)

Qualification timeline

Qualification summary
The following is a list of qualified countries and athletes per event. The qualification standings are valid as of November 24, 2022.

Men
Qualification standings for rankings are as of November 24, 2022.

60 kg

66 kg

73 kg

81 kg

90 kg

100 kg

+100 kg

Women
Qualification standings for rankings are as of November 24, 2022.

48 kg

52 kg

57 kg

63 kg

70 kg

78 kg

+78 kg

References

Qualification
2023
Qualification for the 2023 Pan American Games
American Games, Qualification